ADP-ribosylation-like factor 6 interacting protein 4 (ARL6IP4), also called SRp25 is the product of the ARL6IP4 gene located on chromosome 12q24. 31. Its function is unknown.

Structure 
It is 360 amino acids in length. It is expressed ubiquitously but only in G1/S phase of the cell cycle. The human and mouse mRNAs of this protein have 77% homology.

Two types of amino acid clusters have been observed, a serine cluster and a basic cluster.

Function 
Its function(s) are unknown. However, due to sequence homology of its protein with SR splicing factors, it is widely believed that the protein is nuclear and may have a role in splicing regulation. The protein is believed to be a mediator in the RAC1 signalling pathway.

RNA editing 
The pre-mRNA of the ARL6IP4 gene product is subject to RNA Editing.

Type 
A to I RNA editing is catalyzed by a family of adenosine deaminases acting on RNA (ADARs) that specifically recognize adenosines within double-stranded regions of pre-mRNAs and deaminate them to inosine. Inosines are recognised as guanosine by cellular translational machinery. ADAR 1 and ADAR 2 are the only enzymatically active members. ADAR3 is thought to have a regulatory role in the brain. ADAR1 and ADAR 2 are widely expressed in tissues while ADAR 3 is restricted to the brain. The double stranded regions of RNA are formed by base-pairing between residues in the region close to the editing site with residues usually in a neighboring intron but can be an exonic sequence. The region that base pairs with the editing region is known as an Editing Complementary Sequence (ECS).

Location 
Editing occurs at a K/R editing site within amino acid position 225 of the final protein. Using RT-PCR and sequencing of 100 individual clones, 7% of isoform 3 of the protein showed a G instead of an A at this position during sequencing. Other minor editing sites may be potentially present including some in the same exon as the major editing site. As is the case of IGFBP7, pre-mRNA, editing is unusual as the RNA fold back structure is made up off exonic sequence only.

Effects on protein structure 
Editing at this site results in a codon changed from a Lysine to an Arginine. This occurs in a highly basic region of the protein.

Effects on protein function 
The function of the unedited protein is largely uncharacterised. Therefore, the effect of editing on the pre-mRNA on the proteins function is also unknown. The amino acid change is conservative and is unlikely to massively alter protein function. However, the editing site may be important since the amino acid being altered is a Lysine, which may be involved in the regulation of protein expression. Lysines can be sites of post-translational modification and the conversion of Lysine to an Arginine could affect post-translational modification.

References

External links 
 
 

Human proteins